Kuselyarovo (Küśälär) is a rural locality (a village) in Arkaulovsky Selsoviet, Salavatsky District, Bashkortostan, Russia. The population was 171 as of 2010. There are 4 streets.

Geography 
Kuselyarovo is located 38 km northwest of Maloyaz (the district's administrative centre) by road. Makhmutovo is the nearest rural locality.

References 

Rural localities in Salavatsky District